Pantheinae is a small subfamily of moth family Noctuidae. It used to be considered a family, under the name Pantheidae.

Genera
Anacronicta
Anepholcia
Bathyra
Brandtina
Charadra
Colocasia
Disepholcia
Elydnodes
Gaujonia
Lichnoptera
Meleneta
Moma
Panthauma
Panthea
Pseudopanthea
Smilepholcia
Tambana
Trichosea
Trisulipsa
Trisuloides
Xanthomantis

External links 

 Markku Savela's Lepidoptera and some other life forms: Pantheinae. Version of 2001-DEC-24. Retrieved 2007-JUN-03.

 
Moth subfamilies